Lee Swaby (born 14 May 1976) is a British former professional boxer who competed from 1997 to 2010. At regional level, he challenged twice for the British cruiserweight title in 2004 and 2006, and once for the Commonwealth cruiserweight title in 2004. He holds a notable win over future world cruiserweight champion Enzo Maccarinelli.

Professional career
Swaby began his sporting career as a kickboxer aged 14. He trained at the 'Still Kickboxing Gym' in Lincoln city. Swaby's trainer invited him to attend a trial to join the fighters class. This trial involved a meeting with Jack Boas. He was trained by Jez Hall and went on to win titles including National, British, International and World Championships. He competed all over the world including a fight in New Zealand with Ray Sefo, who was four time world champion.

Swaby retired from kickboxing at the age of 20, following the winning of his second world title in his home town of Lincoln. He began a professional boxing career under the management of Nat Basso as a cruiserweight, winning his first professional fight against Naveed Anwar on 29 April 1997 in Manchester. Swaby went on to win his next three fights in his first year as a professional boxer.

In 2000, Swaby came up against Enzo Maccarinelli in his opponents home town of Swansea. Broadcast on the BBC, he knocked Maccarinelli out in the third round.

Swaby went on to fight boxer Tony Dowling also from his home town of Lincoln in Newark's Grove Leisure Centre on 9 September 2000, with Swaby defeating Dowling with a TKO in the ninth round.

In 2001 Swaby's manager, Nat Basso died, leaving him self-managed before Dennis Hobson of Fight Academy managed him after seeing him in sparring sessions with Clinton Woods.

Following several opponents Swaby went up against Mark Hobson in 2002 at Huddersfield Leisure Centre in Yorkshire, in the BBBofC British cruiserweight title eliminator where he lost on points after a 10-round fight. Despite the loss, Swaby went on to win his next six fights only to return to Huddersfield to face Hobson for the Commonwealth cruiserweight title and the BBBofC British Cruiserweight title. He lost through a technical knockout in round six of a twelve-round fight.

Swaby went on to have six more fights before deciding to become a heavyweight boxer in 2007. After a year out of the boxing ring gaining the weight he fought his first heavyweight battle on 7 December 2007 in Germany against unbeaten Sebastian Koeber and went the full six rounds.

In 2008, Swaby competed in the Matchroom sports' Prizefighter heavyweights tournament, which was aired live on Sky Sports on 12 September 2008, at Metro Radio Arena in Newcastle-upon-Tyne. Swaby beat Darren Morgan to take him into the semi-final before being defeated by Chris Burton.

Swaby took on two more short notice fights including Tyson Fury aired on ITV4's 'Fight night' on 14 March 2009, where Fury was seen punching himself in the face following a failed uppercut. Fury beat Swaby after he retired in his corner in the fourth round.

On 9 May 2009, Swaby fought Paul Butlin for the Midlands Area heavyweight title and won. the following year Swaby organised another boxing show on valentines weekend.
He fought for the British masters Heavy weight title against David Ingleby and won going the full 10 rounds.
Swaby lost another 6 fights all at short notice before retiring his career on 22 October 2010.

Prizefighter
On 12 September 2008, Swaby participated in the Prizefighter competition at the Metro Radio Arena, Newcastle, United Kingdom. Swaby beat Darren Morgan by unanimous decision before losing by unanimous decision to Chris Burton in the semi finals.

Professional boxing record

References

External links

1976 births
English male boxers
Heavyweight boxers
Living people
Sportspeople from Lincoln, England
Prizefighter contestants